Joseph Francis Fitzgerald (October 10, 1904 – March 20, 1987) was an American ice hockey player who competed in the 1932 Winter Olympics.

He was born in Brighton, Massachusetts and died in Needham, Massachusetts. He played football, baseball and hockey for Boston College, graduating in 1928. In the summer of 1926, he played for the Hyannis town team in the Cape Cod Baseball League.

In 1932 he was a member of the American ice hockey team, which won the silver medal. He played one match.

References

External links

Joseph Fitzgerald sports-reference.com

1904 births
1987 deaths
American men's ice hockey defensemen
Ice hockey people from Boston
Ice hockey players at the 1932 Winter Olympics
Boston College Eagles baseball players
Hyannis Harbor Hawks players
Cape Cod Baseball League players (pre-modern era)
Medalists at the 1932 Winter Olympics
Olympic silver medalists for the United States in ice hockey
Baseball players from Boston